The 11th Vermont Infantry Regiment was a three-years infantry regiment in the Union Army during the American Civil War. It served in eastern theater, from September 1862 to August 1865. It served in the XXII Corps in the defenses of Washington D.C., and with the Vermont Brigade in VI Corps. The regiment was mustered into United States service on September 1, 1862, at Brattleboro, Vermont. On December 10, 1862, its designation changed to the 1st Vermont Heavy Artillery.

History
The unit was engaged in, or present at:
 Spotsylvania, Cold Harbor, Petersburg, and the first Battle of Weldon Railroad, now known as the Battle of Jerusalem Plank Road, in the Overland campaign.  In the latter 267 men from the 11th and 140 from the 4th Vermont were captured by a superior force. The captives were all sent to Andersonville prison where 232 of them died.
 Fort Stevens, Charlestown, Gilbert's Ford, Winchester, Fisher's Hill and Cedar Creek in the Shenandoah Valley campaign
 In the Siege of Petersburg.

Losses in the war
The regiment lost during service:
 152 men killed and mortally wounded
 2 died from accidents
 175 died in Confederate prisons
 210 died from disease
 Total loss: 539

The regiment mustered out of service on August 25, 1865.

References

Further reading
 Grant, Frank C., and Kenneth E. Manies. Civil War Journal of Cpl. Frank C. Grant, 1st Vt. Heavy Artillery/11th Vt. Inf. Regiment, Company A. Yuba City, Calif.: K.E. Manies, 2005.

External links
 Vermont National Guard Library and Museum
 1st Vermont Heavy Artillery National Colors, Digital Vermont
 NPS historian Jimmy Blankenship describes the futile charge of the First Maine Heavy Artillery at Petersburg on June 18, 1864

Units and formations of the Union Army from Vermont
Vermont Brigade
1862 establishments in Vermont
Artillery units and formations of the American Civil War